Eivind N. Borge (born 24 February 1950) is a Norwegian politician for the Progress Party.

He served as a deputy representative to the Norwegian Parliament from Østfold during the term 2005–2009.

On the local level Borge is the mayor of Hvaler municipality since 2007.

References

1950 births
Living people
Deputy members of the Storting
Progress Party (Norway) politicians
Mayors of places in Østfold
Place of birth missing (living people)
21st-century Norwegian politicians